The New Orleans mayoral election of 1977 resulted in the election of Ernest Morial as the first African-American mayor of New Orleans.

Background 
Elections in Louisiana—with the exception of U.S. presidential elections—follow a variation of the open primary system. Candidates of any and all parties are listed on one ballot; voters need not limit themselves to the candidates of one party. Unless one candidate takes more than 50% of the vote in the first round, a run-off election is then held between the top two candidates, who may in fact be members of the same party. In this election, the first round of voting was held on October 1, 1977, and the runoff was held on November 12.

The 1977 municipal elections were the first under Louisiana's open primary law signed by Governor Edwin Edwards two years earlier. 

Under the New Orleans City Charter adopted by voters in 1954, Incumbent mayor Moon Landrieu was term-limited.

Results 
Primary, October 1
A total of 154,643 votes were cast

Runoff, November 12

Sources 
 Board of Supervisors of Elections for the Parish of Orleans. Election Returns of Orleans Parish, 1977.

Mayoral elections in New Orleans
1977 Louisiana elections
New Orleans